The Sausalito News was the local newspaper in Sausalito, Marin County, California.  It was published from 1885 to 1960.

The first issue appeared on 12 February 1885. As of early 1900, the paper was published weekly on Saturdays. According to the 1887 Rowell's American Newspaper Directory, the paper positioned itself as "spicy, newsy, saucy and bold" and featured articles on "literary, sporting, society, fashion, scientific and telegraphic" topics.

Sausalito News is part of California Digital Newspaper Collection, a searchable online database containing more than 600,000 pages from historic newspapers of California. The database is free and open to the public.

References

External links
Marin Scope
California Digital Newspaper Collection

Newspapers published in the San Francisco Bay Area
1885 establishments in California